Southfork Ranch is a conference and event center in Parker, in the US state of Texas,  north of Dallas. It includes Ewing Mansion, the setting for the television series Dallas.

History
The house was built in 1970 by Joe Duncan and was known as Duncan Acres, named after his family. The property was originally  in size. The "mansion" at Southfork Ranch is a  house with a  enclosed garage that was turned into a den/card room.

The ranch appears in the television series Dallas. Exterior shots were filmed on location from 1979 until 1989, though Lorimar Productions also made a studio mock-up of the ranch's exterior (complete with swimming pool) in California in 1979 for use when the weather made it impractical to film on location in Texas. From 1989 the series' production shifted entirely to the California studio set. The reunion movies J.R. Returns (1996) and War of the Ewings (1998) returned to the ranch, as did the non-fiction special The Return to Southfork (2004). War of the Ewings, in 1998, was the only time filming was done inside the real ranch for dramatic purposes. Southfork was again used for the new Dallas series. Some scenes in the prequel, Dallas: The Early Years, were filmed there in November 1985. 

In 1993–94 the ranch was featured in the Little Texas music video "God Blessed Texas".

The ranch is now an event and conference center, owned by Forever Resorts. It was home to the KLTY-FM radio Christian concert Celebrate Freedom, held annually during the Independence Day celebration, and hosted the 4 July 2009 "America's Tea Party", which an organizer said drew an estimated crowd of 25,000–35,000.

In December 2012 a memorial service was held at the Southfork Ranch after the death of actor Larry Hagman, who starred as J.R. Ewing in the series. A memorial book for fans to sign was set up in the "J.R. Ewing room".

Gallery

See also
Texas Music Revolution

References

External links

Southfork Ranch -- Official Site
Aerial view

Culture of Dallas
Dallas (TV franchise)
Ranches in Texas
Landmarks in Dallas
Mass media museums in the United States
Historic house museums in Texas
Museums in Collin County, Texas
Residential buildings completed in 1970
1970 establishments in Texas